Eliano Reijnders (born 23 October 2000) is a Dutch professional footballer who plays as a midfielder for Jong Utrecht on loan from PEC Zwolle.

Career
On 24 August 2022, Reijnders joined Jong Utrecht on a season-long loan with an option to buy.

Personal life
Reijnders is the son of Martin Reynders, and the brother of Tijjani Reijnders who are also professional footballers. Reijnders is of Indonesian descent through his mother.

References

External links
 
 Career stats & Profile - Voetbal International

2000 births
Living people
Dutch people of Indonesian descent
Sportspeople from Zwolle
Dutch footballers
Footballers from Overijssel
Association football midfielders
Eredivisie players
PEC Zwolle players
Jong FC Utrecht players